Intempo is a 47-floor, 202-metre-high skyscraper building in Benidorm, Spain. The design of the building was officially presented on 19 January 2006 and work began in 2007. Originally scheduled for completion in 2009, work was significantly hampered by the economic crisis of 2008 which seriously affected the real estate sector in Spain. Construction was almost completed in March 2014, but the sponsoring undertaking went into bankruptcy. In 2018, the building was acquired by SVP Global, and was fully finished by mid-2021.

The building is the tallest in Benidorm and the fifth tallest in Spain.

History
In 2005 a 92-million-euro loan was obtained from Caixa Bank to begin the tower's construction. The building's inauguration was initially scheduled for 2009, then rescheduled to 2011.

Height
It is the tallest building in the city of Benidorm (surpassing the Gran Hotel Bali), the tallest in Spain outside Madrid, one of the tallest in the world in a city of less than 100,000 inhabitants, the tallest residential structure in Spain, and the tallest residential building in the European Union.

Structure
Its frontal view, vaguely resembling the number 11 and the letter M, has led commentators to speculate about a possible reference to the terrorist attacks of 11 March 2004 in Madrid. It is one of the few skyscrapers in the world which has the shape of an arch (another in Europe being the Grande Arche in Paris). The façade of the building is of glass, a first for a residential building in Benidorm.

Problems
The architects, Pérez-Guerras and Olcina & Radúan, resigned.

While reports that the building did not include elevator shafts, were false, poor planning led to unsafe working conditions for the builders, construction outpacing design, and a construction elevator collapse which injured several of the thirteen workers aboard. Efforts to assist these people were hampered by design flaws which did not permit emergency vehicles onto the building site.

References

External links
 Official website
 In Tempo goes on sale

Residential skyscrapers in Spain
Residential buildings completed in 2014
2014 establishments in the Valencian Community
Buildings and structures in Benidorm